Canyons is a novel written by Gary Paulsen. It involves two boys - one lives in modern times (Brennan) while the other is an Indian boy (Coyote Runs) living nearly two hundred years ago.

Plot
Canyons is a book about two boys. One boy is named Coyote Runs (age 14) and the other boy is Brennan Cole (age 15).

The story starts with Brennan making a short narrative about his life and switches back and forth from Brennan and Coyote Runs. Later in the story, the switching ends when Coyote Runs gets shot in the head during his first raid that would, if successful, make him a man among his Apache tribe.  However, he is shot by American soldiers and dies instantly. Nearly two hundred years later, Brennan finds his skull with a bullet hole in its forehead and becomes obsessed with it. From that point on in the novel, a mystical link connects Brennan's mind with Coyote Runs' spirit. After talking to his old biology teacher, he runs sixty miles in a day and a night to return the skull to the top of a canyon - a place Coyote Runs calls his “medicine place." After a grueling run and a chase by Brennan's search party, he gets Coyote Runs' skull back to the medicine place, ending the bond and the novel.

Main characters
Brennan Cole- Brennan Cole lives in El Paso, Texas with his mother.

Coyote Runs- Coyote Runs is a 14-year-old Apache Indian, who lived in the same area during the Civil War.

Reception  
In 1991 Publishers weekly wrote that "Paulsen's coming of age story is remarkable for its simple, restrained text."   Review and React.com said, "This book shows the adventurous mind of the author Gary Paulsen." Kirkus Review noted that "The author uses poetic and semantic resonance...that dims the tale.

Canyons was one of six books cited by the Young Adult Library Services Association when it awarded Paulsen the 1997 Margaret Edwards Award.

Adaptations 
After reviewing the audio book of Canyons Peter Coyote.com said that the abridgement of canyons "does justice to the original story," and it "does not overload the listener."  Publishers weekly wrote that the abridgment of Canyons "heightens the dramatic effect of the tale."

Style 
Gary Paulsen received mostly positive reviews for his original writing style used in Canyons. Publishers Weekly wrote that "Readers with an appetite for Paulsen's  blend of nature and mysticism will overlook Canyon's plot and find savor in its spirit."  SPPS HOME said "Paulsen's use of alternating chapters gets the reader to become more interested or involved in the book."

Major Themes 
Canyons main or major themes have also received positive reviews Random House wrote that "Two boys, separated by the canyons of time and two vastly different cultures, face the challenges by which they will become men.". Groveland parks also mentioned another main theme in its review saying that "The bond between the two boys a century apart in time...grows as Brennan now searches for the final answer.". Powell's books wrote That during "a Grueling journey through the canyon to return the skull Brennan Confronts the challenges of his life.". ABE Books wrote that "Brennan know that neither of the two will find peace until the skull is returned."

References

External links

  Publishing details.

1990 American novels
Novels by Gary Paulsen
American young adult novels